The People's Militia of the Donetsk People's Republic and People's Militia of the Luhansk People's Republic are pro-Russian paramilitaries in the Donbas region of eastern Ukraine, under overall control of the Russian Federation. They are also referred to as Russian separatist forces or Russian proxy forces. They were affiliated with the self-declared Donetsk People's Republic (DPR) and Luhansk People's Republic (LPR) during the war in Donbas (2014–2022), the first stage of the Russo-Ukrainian War. They then supported the Russian Armed Forces against the Armed Forces of Ukraine during the 2022 Russian invasion of Ukraine. In September 2022, Russia annexed the DPR and LPR, and the paramilitaries are being integrated into the Russian military's Southern Military District. They are designated as terrorist groups by the government of Ukraine.

The separatist paramilitaries were formed during the 2014 pro-Russian unrest in Ukraine. The Donbas People's Militia was formed in March 2014 by Pavel Gubarev, who proclaimed himself "People's Governor" of Donetsk Oblast, while the Army of the South-East was formed in Luhansk Oblast. The Donbas war began in April 2014 after these groups seized Ukrainian government buildings in the Donbas, leading the Ukrainian military to launch its Anti-Terrorist Operation against them. 

During the Donbas war, Russian far-right groups were heavily involved in recruiting for the separatists, and many far-right activists joined them and formed volunteer units. The Russian separatists have been held responsible for war crimes, among them the shootdown of Malaysia Airlines Flight 17 and the Mariupol rocket attacks, which they have denied. The militias were also responsible for illegal abductions, detention, and torture of civilians of the Donbas.

The separatist paramilitaries were supported by, and were proxies of, the Russian Armed Forces. Ukraine, the United States, and some analysts consider them to be under the command of Russia's 8th Guards Combined Arms Army. Although the Russian government often denied direct involvement, saying their soldiers were there voluntarily, some of them had been captured with documents that said otherwise. The separatists admitted receiving supplies from Russia, being trained there, and having thousands of Russian citizens in their ranks. By September 2015, the separatist units, at the battalion level and up, were acting under direct command of Russian Army officers. After Russia announced the annexation of four partially occupied regions of Ukraine in September 30, it began to openly integrate the DPR and LNR people's militia's into its military.

Although called "militias", shortly before the 2022 Russian invasion of Ukraine, the separatist republics began forced conscription of men to fight for Russia. The Donbas conscripts have been described as the "cannon fodder" of the Russian forces; by November the casualty rate of the separatist units was almost 50%, according to official separatist sources.

History 

On 3 March 2014, during the 2014 pro-Russian unrest in Ukraine, groups of protesters took control of the regional administration building in Donetsk. An armed opposition group named the Donbas People's Militia, led by Pavel Gubarev, participated. This happened when 11 Ukrainian cities with significant populations of ethnic Russians erupted in demonstrations against the new Ukrainian government. On 6 April 2014, 2,000 pro-Russian protesters rallied outside the regional administration building. On the same day, groups of protesters in Eastern Ukraine stormed the regional administration building in Kharkiv, and the SBU headquarters in Luhansk. The groups created a people's council and demanded a referendum like the one held in Crimea.

Donbas war
On 12 April, armed members of the Donbas People's Militia seized government buildings in Kramatorsk and Sloviansk, and set up checkpoints and barricades. The same day, former members of the Donetsk "Berkut" unit joined the ranks of the Donbas People's Militia.

On 13 April, the newly established Ukrainian government gave the separatists a deadline to disarm or face a "full-scale anti-terrorist campaign" in the region. Later that day, the first reports came in of fighting between the people's militia and Ukrainian troops near Sloviansk, with casualties on both sides. On 14 April, members of the Donbas People's Militia blocked Ukrainian military KrAZ trucks armed with Grad missiles from entering the city.
On 15 April, a full scale "Anti-Terrorist Operation" was launched by the Ukrainian government with aim of restoring their authority over the areas seized by the militia.

On 16 April, the militia entered Sloviansk with six BMD airborne amphibious tracked infantry fighting vehicles they had obtained from elements of the 25th Airborne Brigade who had switched allegiance. A Ukrainian military column was disarmed after the vehicles were blockaded by locals in Kramatorsk. The militia also received a 2S9 "Nona-S" self-propelled 120 mm mortar. On April 20, an unidentified armed group in civilian clothes attacked a militia checkpoint at the entrance to the city of Sloviansk. Three attackers and three members of the militia were killed. On May 14, eight members of the militia seized an IMR armored vehicle from Novokramatorsky Mashinostroitelny Zavod.On May 15, the Donbas People's Militia sent an ultimatum to Kyiv. They demanded the withdrawal of all Ukrainian troops from Donetsk oblast. On May 17, several members of the militia seized two BRDM unarmed armored vehicles from  Severodonetsk and Lysychansk (Luhansk Oblast) On May 22, the Federal State of Novorossiya was declared. On May 23, several members of the people's militia seized another BRDM-RKh unarmed armored vehicle from Loskutovka (Luhansk Oblast)

In July 2014, the estimated manpower of the separatists was around 10,000–20,000.

The militia were widely suspected to have been involved in the downing of a civilian airliner, Malaysia Airlines Flight 17, on 17 July 2014.

On August 8, the militia claimed that after battles near the Russian border, they had captured 67 pieces of equipment in varying conditions (serviceable equipment without ammunition and fuel, with faults, damaged in battle and completely unusable), including 18 "Grad" multiple rocket launching systems, 15 tanks and armored personnel carriers, howitzers, MANPADS, etc. As of August 12, the militia had at least 200 armored vehicles.

The months of July and early August were disastrous for the militias, with many analysts saying they were on the verge of defeat, before a sudden counteroffensive, which the Ukrainian government said was supported by Russian troops, encircled thousands of Ukrainian troops and forced them into a retreat. The militias soon re-captured several strategic positions such as Savur-Mohyla and Luhansk International Airport. 

In September 2014, the DNR and LNR People's Militias became the 1st Army Corps and 2nd Army Corps of the United Armed Forces of Novorossiya (acronym NAF),  which was to be the army of the proposed Novorossiya (New Russia) political union. Lieutenant General Ivan Korsun became its commander-in-chief. The Novorossiya project was suspended in May 2015 due to infighting, but the two separatist armies would still operate in an unified manner.

On 2 February 2015, Head of the DPR, Alexander Zakharchenko, announced that there would be a general mobilization in the DPR of 10,000 volunteers, and he aimed to eventually expand the NAF to 100,000 soldiers.

In March 2015, the estimated manpower of the separatists rose to 30,000–35,000 personnel.

On 20 May 2015 the leadership of the Federal State of Novorossiya announced the termination of the confederation 'project' but the United Armed Forces was retained as the joint armed service of the DPR and LPR.

The Ukrainian government in mid-2015 claimed there were about 42,500 fighters on the separatists' side, which include 9,000 Russian soldiers.

2022 Russian invasion 

During the prelude to the 2022 Russian invasion of Ukraine, the Donetsk and Luhansk People's Republic started a process of mass mobilization of its population in order to build an army for the Russian invasion. As there weren't enough volunteers in the separatist army, and the Russian government wasn't willing to start mobilization of its own population, men from ages 18 until 65 from any background were conscripted to form the separatist army. Groups of DPR/LPR officers roamed the streets searching for men at the age range, arresting and sending to conscription offices any they found. In some regions, up to 80% of employees of local enterprises were called up, which led to the shutdown of mines (the main source of employment in the Donbas) and public transport, resulting in the paralysis of city and public services.

Most of the Donbas conscripts are unexperienced, received little-to-no training and were badly equipped, and suffered from morale issues and heavy casulties. The role of Donbas conscripts by Russian forces has been described as "cannon fodder". There were reports of conscipts being issued antiquated equipment such as World War I-era Mosin–Nagant rifles and the early Cold War-era T-62 tanks. By November, the DPR ombudsman reported that the DPR militia suffered almost 20,000 casualties (both wounded in action and killed in action), translating into a staggering 50% casualty rate, with outside observers believing it could possibly be higher.
The mass conscription has been considered a war crime by some, as the Article 51 of the Fourth Geneva Convention bans the forceful conscription of soldiers from occupied territory, but Russian authorities claimed they are part of the independent sovereign nations of the Donetsk People's Republic and Luhansk People's Republic.

After the leaders of the Russian proxy republics signed treaties of annexation with the Russian president on September 30, 2022, the Russian State Duma approved legislation on October 3 mandating the integration of the "people's militias" into the Russian military, backdated to the date of annexation. Upon the "annexation" of Ukrainian territories in September 2022, Russian occupation officials began forcibly conscripting Ukrainian men in occupied parts of Kherson oblast, and were reportedly ready to mobilize 3,000 in occupied Zaporizhzhia oblast.

On December 31, 2022, Putin visited the Southern Military District headquarters in Rostov-on-Don to present battle colours to representatives of the militias and a command academy in Donetsk, referring to them as the 1st Donetsk Army Corps and 2nd Guards Luhansk-Sievierodonetsk Army Corps. In January 2023 the Russian defence ministry announced that "self-sufficient force groupings" would be established in Ukraine, and in February that four Russian-claimed oblasts in southeastern Ukraine were placed under command of the Southern Military District of the Russian Ground Forces, part of a long-term effort to integrate various irregular forces. On February 19th, the Donetsk and Luhansk People's Militias were formally integrated into the command structure of the Russian Armed Forces.

Structure 

The militias consist of different armed groups, sworn to the Donetsk People's Republic and Luhansk People's Republic. Militant groups which refused to do so were disarmed as gangs in the DPR. Other groups are autonomous forces.

According to Ukrainskyi Tyzhden, a Donetsk Operative Command set up in May 2016 by Russia coordinates the military efforts of the Donetsk People's Republic. The tank battalions they claim Russia can deploy include the DPR Diesel Battalion, and LPR August Battalion. Euromaidan Press reported in September 2018 that the United Armed Forces of Novorossiya comprised two army corps: the 1st Corps, called the "People's Militia of the DNR" and the 2nd Corps, called "People's Militia of the LNR".

On 28 December 2018 commander of the Ukrainian Navy Ihor Voronchenko claimed that the DPR had created a flotilla stationed at Novoazovsk, made up of about 25 converted fishing boats. According to Voronchenko, the DPR had named this flotilla the "9th Regiment of the Marine Corps".

Donetsk People's Republic 
 People's Militia of the Donetsk People's Republic, or 1st Army Corps (DPR) – Formed on 14 November 2014.
Militia forces
  1st Slavyansk Brigade – Brigade formerly commanded by Igor "Strelkov" Girkin. He was the Minister of Defense of allied separatist militias in the DPR and LPR from 16 May to 14 August 2014. Strelkov's name was later revealed to be Igor Girkin, a Moscow-born Russian, Ground Forces veteran and former FSB agent.
 AA Regiment
 Danube Group
  Diesel Battalion – Separate tank battalion formed in 2015, equipped with Soviet equipment, including T-72B1s.
 Dome Group
 Horlivka Group
  Oplot 5th Separate Infantry Brigade or Oplot Brigade (meaning "Bulwark Battalion") – First commanded by Alexander Zakharchenko. Originally a Donbas People's Militia battalion, it expanded to a brigade by September 2014 during the DPR militia restructuring.
 Kolchuga Group
  Russian Imperial Legion  is the military arm of the Russian Imperial Movement, a Russian white supremacist Orthodox nationalist organization that has recruited thousands to fight for the separatists. Imperial Legion and RIM have been recognized as a terrorist movement by Canada and United States for their links to neo-fascist terrorists.
 Novoazovsk Group
 Oplot Group
 Reconnaissance Battalion
  Sparta Battalion – Special forces battalion formed and led by Arsen Pavlov, known as Motorola, until his assassination in 2016. His successor was Vladimir Zhoga, from Sloviansk, and known by Voha. Zhoga was killed in battle in March 2022 during Russia's invasion of Ukraine.
  1st Separate Battalion-Tactical Group "Somalia" or Somalia Battalion – Tactical group led by Lieutenant colonel Mikhail Tolstykh, known as  Givi until his assassination in 2017. In 2022 the Battalion's leader was Lieutenant Colonel Timur Kurilkin.
 Typhoon unit
Special forces
 1st Battalion Khan
 3rd Battalion
  DShRG Rusich – Special forces-type company affiliated with the Kremlin-backed Wagner Group and commanded by Aleksey Milchakov, a Russian Neo Nazi. Made up of far-right Russian and other European volunteers. On July 10, 2015, Milchakov announced that the Rusich Company would be withdrawing from Donbas for retraining and refitting. In April 2022, it was reported that Rusich had returned to eastern Ukraine, this time as part of the private military company Wagner Group.
  Kalmius Brigade – Special forces brigade commanded by Sergei Petrovskiy.
 Rapid Response Team
  Vostok Brigade (meaning "East Brigade") – Special forces brigade founded and led by Alexander Khodakovsky. It has foreign volunteers including Russians and North Ossetians. Begun as a battalion, as of June 2014 it had about 500 men, according to Khodakovsky. It later expanded to a brigade.
Rear forces
 Engineering Battalion
 Patriotic Forces of Donbas
 Electric Warfare unit
 Steppe Battalion
  DPR Republican Guard – Elite unit created by Alexander Zakharchenko on January 12, 2015. Commanded by Major-general Ivan Kondratov, and composed of six battalions that total more than 3,000 fighters.
  Slavic Unification and Revival Battalion or Svarozhich Battalion – formed by members of the Rodnovery (Slavic native faith) movement, at its peak 1,200 fighters, now part of the Vostok Brigade.
 Repair Battalion
  International Brigade "Pyatnashka" (meaning "15th Brigade") – International brigade commanded by Akhra Avidzba, known by Abkhaz. DPR positions in Marinka are held by this unit.
 Support Battalion
  Mariupol-Khingan Naval Infantry – Formed in 2016. The name is based on the Soviet World War II 221st Infantry Mariupol-Khingan Red Banner Order of Suvorov Rifle Division.
  Vikings Battalion – Motorized infantry unit formed in 2015.
 DPR Security Service Battalion – Security Service of the Donetsk People's Republic.
 Horlivka Group
Territorial defence
 1st Battalion
  2nd Territorial Defense Battalion "Miner's Division" – Reorganized into a territorial defensive battalion after September 2014.
 3rd Battalion
 4th Battalion
 5th Battalion
 6th Battalion

Luhansk People’s Republic 
 People's Militia of the Luhansk People's Republic, or 2nd Army Corps (LPR) – Formed on 7 October 2014.
Militia forces 
 1st Separate Mechanized Brigade "August" or August Battalion – The only tank battalion in the LPR People's Militia.
  2nd Guards Motorized Rifle Brigade named after Kliment Voroshilov.
  4th Guards Motorized Rifle Brigade
 6th Separate Cossack Motorized Rifle Regiment named after Ataman Matvei Platov.
 7th Chistyakovskaya Motorized Rifle Brigade
  Zarya Battalion (meaning "Dawn Battalion") – First commander was Igor Plotnitsky. Commanded by Andrei Patrushev.
 AA Battalion
 Artillery Brigade
 Command Regiment
  Cossacks Motorized Brigade – Don Cossack volunteer group commanded by Rashid Shakirzanov. The group has over 4,000 fighters and access to armor and artillery. From May to November 2014, the group was commanded by Ataman Nikolai Kozitsyn. Kozitsyn was forcibly removed from power in November 2014 and replaced by Shakirzanov. The group's headquarters is in Antratsyt, and their rule expands to Krasnyi Luch. Initially, this group was identified as Russian Special Forces by the U.S. State Department following the takeover of the Sloviansk city council. In November 2014, the group instated capital punishment in Perevalsk to deter crime. Kozitsyn stated that there is no more marauding, burglaries or car-jacking in the city. They refused to join the LPR's military command, but cooperate with them, remaining autonomous and controlling territory.
 Dawn Battalion
 Tank Battalion
Special forces
  Leshiy Battalion (meaning "Forest-spirit Battalion") – Special forces battalion commanded by Aleksey Pavlov.
 Recon Battalion
 Special Forces Battalion
Rear forces
 Repair Battalion
 Support Battalion
  First Cossack Regiment – Don Cossack volunteer group commanded by Ataman Pavel Dryomov. The group has around 1,300 fighters, and its headquarters is in Stakhanov. Originally part of Kozitsyn's Cossack National Guard until it split in September 2014. Dryomov denounced the LPR's leadership as corrupt and "pro-oligarchic". Dryomov was killed on 12 December 2015 when his car was blown up by an unknown perpetrator the day after his wedding.
  Interbrigades – Russian volunteers – national-bolsheviks, members of The Other Russia.
 7th Motorized Brigade
 Mechanized Brigade "Prizrak" or Prizrak Brigade (meaning "Ghost Brigade") – Mechanized infantry brigade commanded by Yuri Shevchenko, formed and led by Aleksey Mozgovoy until his assassination on 23 May 2015. The group keeps its distance from LPR authorities and is based in Alchevsk and the surrounding district.
 AA Battalion
  Continental Unit – French, Serbian and Brazilian volunteer group.
  DKO – Volunteer Communist Detachment, an international organisation commanded by Piotr Biriukov.
 Artillery Brigade
Territorial defence
 17th Battalion
 Ataman Battalion
 Kulkin Battalion
 Lishi Battalion
 Poid Battalion
 Prizrak Battalion
 Rim Battalion
 USSR Bryanka Battalion

Former units 

  Army of the South-East – Main militia forces of the Luhansk People's Republic from Mid April to 16 September 2014.
  Cossack Army – An international organisation that recruits volunteers from Ukraine and Russia.
 Death
 Luhansk Region People's Militia
  Donbas People's Militia – Main militia of the Donetsk People's Republic from 3 March to 16 September 2014.
  Russian Orthodox Army – A senior commander of the unit is Alexander Verin. One of the armed groups which control Donetsk, mostly firmed from locals from coal mine towns. It reportedly had 100 members at its founding. According to Ukrainian sources, in June 2014 it had at least 350 fighters. According to independent sources, as fighting between separatists and the Ukrainian government worsened in Donbas, membership rose to 4,000. In September 2014, the ROA changed its format and merged with the newly created Oplot 5th Separate Infantry Brigade of the DPR People's Militia.
 Pyatnashka
  Miners' Division – Founded shortly after the rebel withdrawal from Sloviansk and Kramatorsk, commanded by Konstantin Kuzmin. Fighters range from ages 22–60. Composed of former coal miners. Reorganized into a territorial defensive battalion after September 2014.
  Novorossiya Humanitarian Battalion – Non-combat unit involved in protecting the delivery of humanitarian aid.
  DShRG Ratibor – Group that was formed by Russian nationalists.
 Ratibor
 United Battalions of the DPR and LPR.
  Kalmius Battalion – Special forces battalion commanded by Sergei Petrovskiy. Formerly a subsidiary of the Miner's Division, until they split post-September 2014.
 Consolidated Orthodox Battalion "Voshod" or Voshod Battalion (meaning "Sunrise Battalion") – Formed in June 2014, it had 300 fighters.
 North Battalion (DPR) (unofficial)
  Jovan Šević Detachment – Serbian Chetnik-led group commanded by Bratislav Živković, with 450 fighters.
  Orthodox Dawn – Bulgarian nationalist volunteer group.
  Legion of Saint Stephen – Hungarian subgroup of international battalions. The group espouses a Hungarian nationalist platform, demanding self-determination for the Hungarian minority in Zakarpattia Oblast, and has been accused of being close to the far-right Jobbik party in Hungary.
  Carlos Palomino International Brigade (Spanish: Brigada Internacional Carlos Palomino) – Spanish antifascist volunteer group.
  Varyag Battalion, meaning "Varangian Battalion," and named for a Russian volunteer Nazi brigade – Volunteer battalion commanded by Alexander Matyushin, a neo-Nazi and former head of Donetsk Russkiy Obraz.
  Rapid Response Group "Batman" or Batman Battalion – Commanded by Alexander Bednov until he was killed in an attack on his convoy on 1 January 2015. Members of the group said that the attack was ordered by head of the Luhansk People's Republic Igor Plotnitsky. According to them, Bednov and his fighters were killed "by order of Plotnitsky" because he was "ordered to sweep all intransigent commanders." Following this attack, the LPR arrested some of Bednov's men, and dissolved the battalion. Some of its personnel were dispersed into other LPR units, while DPR field commanders Givi and Motorola invited former members to join their battalions.
  Separate Brigade of Special Purpose "Odessa"
  Interunit –  A far-left military political unit build inside the Prizrak Brigade composed of internationalist volunteers formed in 2015. The bulk of the volunteers came from Spain, while was commanded by an Italian fighter called "Nemo". It was operational until 2017.

Commanders 

 Donetsk People's Republic
 Denis Pushilin – Head of the DPR
 Alexander Zakharchenko
 Vladimir Kononov
 Eduard Basurin
 Pavel Gubarev (former)
 "Romashka" (nom de guerre), real name Sergei Zhurikov (Russian: Сергей Журиков)
 Alexander Khodakovsky
 Igor Bezler (former)
 Alexander Verin
 "Botsman"
 Konstantin Kuzmin
 Sergei Petrovskiy
 Motorola (nom de guerre), real name Arsen Pavlov
 Givi (nom de guerre), real name Mikhail Tolstykh
 Akhra Avidzba
 Ivan Milosevic
 Roman Kutuzov, commander 1AC, major general in the Russian Ground Forces, killed 5 May 2022, in Popasna Raion, Luhansk Oblast, Ukraine
 Luhansk People's Republic
 Leonid Pasechnik – Head of the LPR
 Igor Plotnitsky (former)
 Valery Bolotov (former)
 Nikolai Kozitsyn (former)
 Pavel Dryomov (his car was blown up by unknown)
 Aleksey Mozgovoy
 Alexander Bednov
 Yuri Shevchenko
Oleg Bugrov , former Minister of Defence, a position which was allegedly abolished in the DPR on 1 October 2018.

Equipment 

According to Armament Research Services (ARES), the rebels mostly used equipment that was available domestically before the Ukrainian crisis. However, they were also seen with weapons that were not known to have been exported to Ukraine, or otherwise be available there, including some of the latest models of Russian military equipment, never exported outside Russia. According to the Donetsk People's Republic, all of its military equipment is "hardware that we took from the Ukrainian military". However, according to the Ukrainian government and the United States Department of State, this is a false. They claim the separatists have received military equipment from Russia, including multiple rocket launch systems and tanks. Although Russian officials deny supplying arms to the militia, substantial evidence proves supports this. In August 2014 Ukrainian Defense Minister Valeriy Heletey said the proof for the weapons supply from Russia was that the fighters of the Donbas People's Militia were using Russian-made weapons never used (or bought) by the Ukrainian army.

Such exclusively Russian equipment seen with pro-Russian separatists includes Russian modifications of T-72 tanks (particularly T-72B3 and T-72BA seen destroyed in Ukraine), BTR-82AM infantry fighting vehicle (adopted in Russia in 2013), BPM-97 armored personnel carriers, sophisticated anti-aircraft system Pantsir-S1, multipurpose vehicle GAZ Vodnik (adopted in Russia in 2005), Russian modifications of MT-LB, rocket-propelled flamethrower MRO-A, anti-tank missile Kornet, anti-materiel rifle ASVK, suppressed sniper rifle VSS Vintorez and others.

Military training

Higher Combined Arms Command School 
The Donetsk Higher Combined Arms Command School is a higher level institution in the ideological training of cadets. People from both the DPR and LPR can enroll at the school. It prepares future command cadres in four areas: reconnaissance, tank forces, infantry, and political officers. Upon graduation, the cadets are commissioned as lieutenants. Since the fall of 2016, the Military Lyceum is affiliated to the DHCACS.

Military-Physical Training Lyceum 

The Georgy Beregovoy Military-Physical Training Lyceum is an educational facility of the People's Militia, being akin to the Suvorov Military School or the Ivan Bohun Military High School. It was established on 15 May 1993 by decree of the Cabinet of Ministers of Ukraine as the Donetsk Higher Military-Political School of Engineering and Signal Corps. From 1993 to 2000, the Lyceum was with a three-year form of study. Over two decades, 2,793 graduates graduated from the institution, more than 1,000 of them currently serve in officer posts in various power structures of Ukraine. It was renamed and converted in 2014; since then more than 300 students have graduated. The school is open to boys between 14 and 16 years old, many of whom come from military families. The cadets live at the school six days a week.

Relationship with Russia 

The conclusion of criminal investigation of the Dutch court on the MH17 case was that "Russian Federation exercised overall control over the DPR", referring to vast evidence demonstrating frequent contacts between the DPR and LPR officials, and the President's Administration of Russian Federation as well as heads of FSB and Russian military.

As the conflict intensified, the Donbas People's Militia was bolstered with many volunteers from the former Soviet Union, mainly Russia; including fighters from Chechnya and North Ossetia.

According to the Ukrainian government and the United States Department of State the Donbas People's Militia has received military equipment from Russia, including Russian tanks and multiple rocket launchers. Russia has denied supplying weapons and has described the Russian citizens fighting with the Donbas People's Militia as volunteers. The Donetsk People's Republic claimed on 16 August 2014 that it had received (together with 30 tanks and 120 other armoured vehicles of undisclosed origin) 1,200 "individuals who have gone through training over a four-month period on the territory of the Russian Federation". Prime Minister of the DPR Alexander Zakharchenko said in August 2014 that it had not received military equipment from Russia; and all of its military equipment was "hardware that we took from the Ukrainian military".

Some injured militia members received medical care in Russia. In mid-August 2014, hospitals such as the Donetsk Central Hospital in Donetsk, Russia tended to between ten and twenty injured fighters daily. The Russian Emergency Ministry assisted with treatment logistics. Those questioned and registered by the (Russian) Federal Security Service and treated in Russia during this period stated that they would not return to Ukraine if the Ukrainian army won the Russo-Ukrainian War, but would, instead, engage in a partisan warfare campaign in Eastern Ukraine.

According to various sources, the troops of the separatists forces are under direct control of officers of the Russian Armed Forces. Specifically the 8th Guards Combined Arms Army, which has been recreated for this specific task since 2017.

In February 2022, the UK defence ministry and the Institute for the Study of War reported that the Russian Armed Forces had officially extended the Russian Southern Military District into parts of Ukraine as part of integrating the DPR and LPR people's militias into Russian forces.

Ideology of the forces 

According to a 2016 report by French Institute of International Relations (IFRI), Russian ethnic and imperialist nationalism has shaped the official ideology of the Donetsk and Luhansk People's Republics. During the war in Donbas, especially at the beginning, far-right groups played an important role on the pro-Russian side, arguably more so than on the Ukrainian side. They gradually became less important in Donbas as the need for Russian radical nationalists waned. According to Marlène Laruelle, separatists in Donbas produced an ideology composed of three strands of Russian nationalism: Fascist, Orthodox and Soviet.

Far-right 

Members and former members of Russian National Unity (RNU), the National Bolshevik Party, the Eurasian Youth Union, and Cossack groups formed branches to recruit volunteers to join the separatists. A former RNU member, Pavel Gubarev, was founder of the Donbas People's Militia and first "governor" of the Donetsk People's Republic. RNU is particularly linked to the Russian Orthodox Army, one of a number of separatist units described as "pro-Tsarist" and "extremist" Orthodox nationalists. In June 2014, the Russian Orthodox Army was accused of murdering four Pentecostals in Sloviansk. The men were accused of spying for the Ukrainian government, but the case has been cited as part of a policy of religious persecution by the separatists.

Neo-Nazi units such as 'Rusich', 'Varyag' and 'Svarozhich' fought as part of the Russian militias from early 2014 and used Slavic swastikas on their badges, although some, such as 'Varyag', have since been disbanded. 'Rusich' is part of the Wagner Group, a Russian mercenary group in Ukraine which has been linked to far-right extremism.

Some of the most influential far-right Russian separatists are neo-imperialists, who seek to revive the Russian Empire. These included Igor 'Strelkov' Girkin, first "minister of defence" of the Donetsk People's Republic, who espouses Russian neo-imperialism and ethno-nationalism. The Russian Imperial Legion, the fighting arm of the Russian Imperial Movement, a white supremacist militant group, has recruited thousands of volunteers to join the separatists. Some separatists have flown the black-yellow-white Russian imperial flag, such as the Sparta Battalion and the (now disbanded) 'Ratibor' unit. In 2014, volunteers from the National Liberation Movement joined the Donetsk People's Militia bearing portraits of Tsar Nicholas II. Other Russian nationalist volunteers involved in separatist militias included members of banned groups such as the Slavic Union and Movement Against Illegal Immigration. Another Russian separatist paramilitary unit, the Interbrigades, is made up of activists from the National Bolshevik (Nazbol) group Other Russia. An article in Dissent noted that "despite their neo-Stalinist paraphernalia, many of the Russian-speaking nationalists Russia supports in the Donbass are just as right-wing as their counterparts from the Azov Battalion".

Far-right nationalists from other countries have also fought for the Russian separatists, such as the Hungarian nationalist 'Legion of Saint Stephen', the Bulgarian nationalist 'Orthodox Dawn' and the Serbian Chetnik 'Jovan Šević Detachment', as well as members of Serbian Action.  According to the Italian newspaper la Repubblica, well-known Italian neo-fascist Andrea Palmeri (former member of the far-right New Force party) has been fighting for the Donetsk People's Republic since 2014 and was hailed by Gubarev as a "real fascist". Professor Anton Shekhovtsov, an expert on far-right movements in Russia and abroad, reported in 2014 that members of Polish neo-fascist group "Falanga" and Italian far-right group "Millennium" had joined the Donbas separatists. French Eurasianists, notably the far-right organization "Continental Unity", have also been accused of recruiting far-right extremists across Europe to fight for the Donbas separatists. Swedish and Finnish far-right groups, such as the "Power Belongs to the People" party, reportedly recruited volunteers to fight for the separatists, while members of the neo-Nazi "Nordic Resistance Movement" were seen attending paramilitary training in Russia. Other far-right foreign fighters from Europe and North America have fought alongside the pro-Russian separatists in Donbas, including white nationalists, neo-Nazis, neo-fascists and Christian nationalists. Motivations for these fighters have included the belief that they are fighting America and Western interests and that Vladimir Putin is a bulwark for "traditional white European values" who they must support against the "decadent West".

In April 2022, news outlets noted that a video posted on Donetsk People's Republic's website showed Denis Pushilin awarding a medal to Lieutenant Roman Vorobyov (Somalia Battalion), while Vorobyov was wearing patches affiliated with neo-Nazism: the Totenkopf used by the 3rd SS Panzer Division, and the valknut. However, the video did not show Vorobyov getting his medal when it was posted on Pushilin's website.

While far-right activists played a part in the early days of the conflict, their importance was often exaggerated, and their importance on both sides of the conflict declined over time. The political climate in Donetsk further pushed far-right groups into the margins.

Far-left 

Far-left volunteers have also fought for pro-Russian forces, accusing the Ukrainian government of being a "fascist state" and seeking to engage in an "anti-fascist struggle". However, these leftist volunteers have co-operated with far-right groups in Donbas. Among the initial volunteers were members of the Communist Party of Ukraine, as well as some members of trade unions and labor organizations opposed to the new government that emerged after the Ukrainian Revolution.

A small number of Spanish socialists travelled to Ukraine to fight for the separatists, with some explaining they were "repaying the favour" to Russia for the USSR's support to Republicans during the Spanish Civil War. They were also enlisting in solidarity with those who died in the Unions House fire. Spanish fighters established the 'Carlos Palomino International Brigade', which fought under the flag of the Second Spanish Republic. In 2015, it reportedly had less than ten members, and was later disbanded. Beness Aijo, a Latvian National Bolshevik of Ugandan and Russian descent, was arrested in Donetsk in 2014 for fighting with separatist forces and the National Bolshevik Interbrigades. A female member of the Israeli Communist Party had also reportedly joined the separatists in 2015. Other examples were the 'DKO' (Volunteer Communist Unit) and the Interunit, both composed of foreign communist volunteers; the Interunit has been inactive since 2017.

War crime allegations

An 18 November 2014 United Nations report on eastern Ukraine stated that the DPR was in a state of "total breakdown of law and order". The report noted "cases of serious human rights abuses by the armed groups continued to be reported, including torture, arbitrary and incommunicado detention, summary executions, forced labour, sexual violence, as well as the destruction and illegal seizure of property may amount to crimes against humanity".

In September 2015, Organization for Security and Co-operation in Europe (OSCE) published a report on the testimonies of victims held in places of illegal detention in Donbas. In December 2015, a team led by Małgorzata Gosiewska published a comprehensive report on war crimes in Donbas.

See also
 2014 pro-Russian unrest in Ukraine
 Donetsk People's Republic
 Luhansk People's Republic
 2014 Odesa clashes
 2014 Donbas status referendums
 2014 Donbas general elections
 2018 Donbas general elections
 Russian military presence in Transnistria
 2014 Russian sabotage activities in Ukraine

Notes

References

Separatist forces of the war in Donbas
2014 establishments in Ukraine
History of Donetsk Oblast

Military units and formations established in 2014
Organizations based in Europe designated as terrorist
Novorossiya (confederation)